The airline transport pilot licence (ATPL), or in the United States of America, an airline transport pilot (ATP) certificate  is the highest level of aircraft pilot certificate. In the United States, those certified as airline transport pilots (unconditional) are authorized to act as pilot in command on scheduled air carriers' aircraft under CFR 14 Part 121. In the UK, pilots must hold an ATPL before they can be pilot in command on an aircraft with nine or more passenger seats.

Context 

Any pilot operating an aircraft for pay must start by obtaining a commercial pilot licence (CPL). Airline transport pilot certifications do not have special endorsements, such as an instrument rating, as airline transport pilots must already possess knowledge and training in these areas. However, aircraft heavier than 12,500 pounds still require pilots to have a "type rating" (specific to the make and model of aircraft) certification.

Theoretical examination

EASA 

The EASA ATPL requires candidates to pass fourteen separate theoretical exams, with a six-month residential or twelve-month distance-learning course mandatory during this phase.

In European Union Aviation Safety Agency (EASA) states and the United Kingdom, the 14 theoretical subjects included in the examination of ATPL applicants are:
 Air law
 Aircraft General Knowledge — Airframe/Systems/Power plant
 Instrumentation
 Mass and Balance
 Performance
 Flight Planning and Monitoring
 Human Performance
 Meteorology
 General navigation
 Radio navigation
 Operational Procedures
 Principles of Flight
 IFR Communications
 VFR Communications

All exams must be passed within an 18-month period. A CPL and/or Instrument Rating must then be gained within 36 months. Provided that a CPL and IR are achieved, ATPL examination results are accepted for seven years after the most recent validity date of the IR entered in the CPL.

ATPL exams are acceptable for the issue of a CPL, so most pilots skip the CPL exams and take their ATPL exams before they obtain their CPL.

United States of America 

The FAA ATP certificate requires one theoretical knowledge test covering the required knowledge areas. A $5,000 ATP CTP (Airline Transport Pilot Certification Training Program, usually paid for by a hiring airline) course is required but this alone does not prepare an applicant for the knowledge test.  Several weeks of additional self-study using training software is required for a realistic chance of passing the test.

Eligibility

EASA  

An applicant for an ATPL must hold a CPL(A) and a multi-engine IR for airplanes. The applicant shall also have received instruction in Multi Crew Cooperation. Alternatively, the applicant must hold an MPL (Multi Pilot License).

The applicant must have 1500 hours as a pilot of airplanes, including 500 hours in multi-pilot operations on airplanes, and a minimum number of hours as pilot in command (PIC) and/or pilot in command under supervision (PICUS).

The applicant must pass a skill test, demonstrating their ability to perform procedures and maneuvers, as PIC of a multi-pilot airplane under IFR.

The ATPL flight test must be taken on a multi-crew aircraft or flight simulator.

United States of America  

To be eligible to take the Federal Aviation Administration's (FAA) ATP practical test, the candidate must have at least 1500 hours of experience in aircraft, including 250 hours as a pilot-in-command (PIC), and be at least 23-years-old. Restricted Licenses (which allow the holder to perform only second-in-command duties) may be granted to individuals that meet one of the following criteria:
 Military pilots who are 21 years or older with 750 hours total time.
 Graduates with a four-year degree in aviation from certain approved universities, that have 1000 hours of total flight time and are 21 years or older.
 Graduates with a two-year degree in aviation, who have 1250 hours and are 21 years or older.
 Pilots with 1500 hours who are 21 years or older.
The pilot can remove the restriction once they have achieved the normal prerequisites.

The FAA ATP flight test can be taken in a light piston aircraft with 1,500 hours of experience, however, the FAA additionally requires a 'Type Rating' to pilot any large or jet-powered aircraft. Most FAA-certified pilots earn their ATP certificate and Type Rating (aircraft specific) simultaneously via the successful completion of a part 121 airline training program and type rating check-ride.

See also  

 EASA pilot licensing
 Pilot certification in the United States
 Pilot licensing and certification
 Pilot licensing in Canada
 Pilot licensing in the United Kingdom

References

External links
 Air Transport Pilot and Aircraft Type Rating Practical Test Standards for Airplane. FAA, August 2006.
 FAA definitions of US civil airmen types

Aviation licenses and certifications